Edward Arthur Dodwell (1919 – 22 May 2009) was a senior police officer in India.

He was educated at the Lord Williams's School, Thame and then joined the Indian Imperial Police, rising to be Commissioner of Maharashtra. He subsequently remained in Bombay, becoming Director General of the Laxmi Vishnu Cotton Mills.

References
 http://announce.jpress.co.uk/bucks-herald/memorial/edward-arthur-ted-dodwell/4044719

1919 births
2009 deaths
People from Thame
People educated at Lord Williams's School
British colonial police officers
Indian police chiefs
British people in colonial India